Sean Tait may refer to:

Shaun Tait, cricketer
 Sean Tate, Hollyoaks character